The Pai River is a river that originates in the mountains of the Daen Lao Range, Pai District, Mae Hong Son Province, Thailand. The river flows first in a north-south direction and then in an east-west direction down to Mueang Mae Hong Son District and across the Thai/Burmese border. The river tributes the Salween River in Kayah State, Burma.

Its name in the Lanna language means "male elephant", comparable to the word "Plai" in the central Thai language. There is a story that in 1477 during the reign of King Tilokaraj, who was the ruler of Lanna Kingdom. He ordered his cousin Prince Si Chaiya to attack Ban Don. Meanwhile, one of his white elephants fled,  he ordered the soldiers to find and found that it was swimming in this river.

Pai River is popular for whitewater rafting. Rapids on the river vary from class I to class IV on the International Scale of River Difficulty and everything in between. back in 2006 a dutch tourist name Susan van Amerom age of 21 was fall of the PVC boat by accident and died in Pai river Run by Guide Tep on a rafting company call Pai Adventure that later on was changing the owner.  Other than that The Pai River offers a scenic view of mountain forest and many choose to camp along the quiet river banks.

See also
River systems of Thailand

References

External links
Pai River in Mae Hong Son
A New Cyprinid Fish, Hampala salweenensis, from the Mae Pai River
Huai Nam Dang National Park

Pai
Salween River
International rivers of Asia
Geography of Mae Hong Son province